The 1969 British Open Championship was held at the Abbeydale Park in Sheffield from 21–29 January 1969. Geoff Hunt won the title defeating Cameron Nancarrow in the final. This was the first time that the event took place outside London. Returning after a seven-year absence the 1962 semi-finalist Dardir El Bakary represented New Zealand instead of Egypt.

Seeds

Draw and results

Semi-finals & Final

Section 1

Section 2

Section 3

Section 4

References

Men's British Open Squash Championships
Squash in England
Men's British Open Championship
Men's British Open Squash Championship
Men's British Open Squash Championship, 1969
Men's British Open Squash Championship, 1969
Men's British Open Squash Championship